Tracy Jo Pollan (born June 22, 1960), is an American actress. She is best known for her role as Ellen Reed on the sitcom Family Ties (1985–1987).

Early life 
Pollan was born on Long Island, New York, the daughter of Corinne Elaine "Corky" (Staller), a magazine editor, and Stephen Michael Pollan, a financial consultant and writer. She was raised in Woodbury, New York. Pollan is from a Russian Jewish family and was raised in the faith. She attended Syosset High School and later graduated from the Dalton School in Manhattan, New York. She studied acting at the Herbert Berghof Studio and later at the Lee Strasberg Institute.

Personal life 

Pollan was in a five-year relationship with actor Kevin Bacon in the 1980s. She first met Michael J. Fox when she played the girlfriend of his character on Family Ties; they worked together again on the set of Bright Lights, Big City a couple of years later and began a relationship. They married on July 16, 1988. They have four children together; a son Sam, twin daughters Aquinnah Kathleen and Schuyler Frances, and a daughter Esmé Annabelle.

Publications 
In October 2014, Pollan, along with her two sisters and mother, co-authored The Pollan Family Table, a cookbook of family recipes, kitchen tips and cooking techniques. The foreword was written by her brother, Michael Pollan, who is an author of several books about socio-cultural impacts of food.

Filmography

Film

Television

Theatre

References

External links

 
 
 Pollan Family Table

20th-century American actresses
21st-century American actresses
Actresses from New York (state)
American film actresses
American people of Russian-Jewish descent
American stage actresses
American television actresses
Dalton School alumni
Jewish American actresses
Lee Strasberg Theatre and Film Institute alumni
Living people
Michael J. Fox
People from Woodbury, Nassau County, New York
Syosset High School alumni
1960 births